John Hussey may refer to:

John Hussey (MP for Horsham and New Shoreham) (c.1520–c.1572), MP for Horsham and New Shoreham
John Hussey, 1st Baron Hussey of Sleaford (1465/1466 – 1536/1537), Chief Butler of England
John Hussey (American football official), NFL official
John E. Hussey (?–1922), African-American politician from North Carolina